Ding is an international mobile recharge service, allowing users to send mobile top-up to friends and family in over 150 countries and across more than 500 global operators.

History 
The company was founded by Mark Roden on June 23, 2006. In October 2019 the company opened a new office in London. In 2016, Ding acquired French retail top-up company called Transfert Credit.

In 2018 Ding released its DingConnect API, allowing businesses to integrate the Ding platform to sell or offer mobile top-up on their website or mobile app. In 2018, the company was listed by the Financial Times as one of Europe’s fastest growing companies. In January 2019, Ding agreed a partnership with Logista that will see it provide international top-up services at over 10,000 Spanish outlets. On May 19, 2019 Ding announced its partnership with LuLu Money to offer international mobile top-up to foreign workers living in the Asia Pacific region.

As of 2022, its users have sent over 500 million mobile top-ups online, on the Ding app and across 600,000 retail outlets worldwide.

References

External links 

Mobile telecommunication services
Technology companies of the Republic of Ireland